One Day International (ODI) cricket is played between international cricket teams who are Full Members of the International Cricket Council (ICC) as well as the top four Associate members. Unlike Test matches, ODIs consist of one inning per team, having a limit in the number of overs, currently 50 overs per innings – although in the past this has been 55 or 60 overs. ODI cricket is List-A cricket, so statistics and records set in ODI matches also count in List-A cricket records. The earliest match recognised as an ODI was played between England and Australia in January 1971; since when there have been over 4,000 ODIs played by 28 teams. 
This is a list of Netherlands Cricket team's One Day International records. It is based on the List of One Day International cricket records, but concentrates solely on records dealing with the Netherlands cricket team. Netherlands played its first ever ODI in 1996.

Key
The top five records are listed for each category, except for the team wins, losses, draws and ties, all round records and the partnership records. Tied records for fifth place are also included. Explanations of the general symbols and cricketing terms used in the list are given below. Specific details are provided in each category where appropriate. All records include matches played for Netherlands only, and are correct .

Team records

Overall Record 

Note: Tied matches considered as half win.

W/L ratio and win % excluded the matches which ended in No result.

Head to Head records 
, Netherlands has played 92 ODI matches resulting in 34 Victories, 53 Defeats, 1 Ties and 4 No results for W/L ratio of 0.64 and an overall winning percentage of 39.20.

First bilateral ODI series wins

First ODI match wins

Team scoring records

Most runs in an innings
The highest innings total scored in ODIs came in the match between England and Australia in June 2018. Playing in the third ODI at Trent Bridge in Nottingham, the hosts posted a total of 481/6. The first ODI of the 2007 series against the Bermuda saw Netherlands set their highest innings total of 315/8.

Fewest runs in an innings
The lowest innings total scored in ODIs has been scored twice. Zimbabwe were dismissed for 35 by Sri Lanka during the third ODI in Sri Lanka's tour of Zimbabwe in April 2004 and USA were dismissed for same score by Nepal in the sixth ODI of the 2020 ICC Cricket World League 2 in Nepal in February 2020. The lowest score in ODI history for Netherlands is 80 scored in the first match of the 2007 Quadrangular Series in Ireland against West Indies.

Most runs conceded an innings
The first ODI of the 2006 series against the Sri Lanka saw Netherlands concede their highest innings total of 443/9.

Fewest runs conceded in an innings
The lowest score conceded by Netherlands for a full inning is 67 scored by Canada in the Round 7 2011–2013 ICC World Cricket League Championship.

Most runs aggregate in a match
The highest match aggregate scored in ODIs came in the match between South Africa and Australia in the fifth ODI of March 2006 series at Wanderers Stadium, Johannesburg when South Africa scored 438/9 in response to Australia's 434/4. The first ODI of the 2006 series against Sri Lanka in VRA Cricket Ground, Amstelveen saw a total of 691 runs being scored.

Fewest runs aggregate in a match
The lowest match aggregate in ODIs is 71 when USA were dismissed for 35 by Nepal in the sixth ODI of the 2020 ICC Cricket World League 2 in Nepal in February 2020. The lowest match aggregate in ODI history for Netherlands is 137 scored in the Round 7 2011–2013 ICC World Cricket League Championship against Canada, which is joint 16th lowest of all time.

Result records
An ODI match is won when one side has scored more runs than the total runs scored by the opposing side during their innings. If both sides have completed both their allocated innings and the side that fielded last has the higher aggregate of runs, it is known as a win by runs. This indicates the number of runs that they had scored more than the opposing side. If the side batting last wins the match, it is known as a win by wickets, indicating the number of wickets that were still to fall.

Greatest win margins (by runs)
The greatest winning margin by runs in ODIs was New Zealand's victory over Ireland by 290 runs in the only ODI of the 2008 England tour. The largest victory recorded by Netherlands, was the first ODI at the 2007 series against Bermuda by 172 runs.

Greatest win margins (by balls remaining)
The greatest winning margin by balls remaining in ODIs was England's victory over Canada by 8 wickets with 277 balls remaining in the 1979 Cricket World Cup. The largest victory recorded by Netherlands, which is the joint-15th largest victory, is on the Round 7 of 2011–2013 ICC World Cricket League Championship against Canada when they won by 9 wickets with 236 balls remaining.

Greatest win margins (by wickets)
A total of 55 matches have ended with chasing team winning by 10 wickets with West Indies winning by such margins a record 10 times. Netherlands have won an ODI match by a margin of 9 wickets on 2 occasions.

Highest successful run chases
South Africa holds the record for the highest successful run chase which they achieved when they scored 438/9 in response to Australia's 434/9. Netherlands' highest innings total while chasing is 291/7 in a successful run chase against Zimbabwe at Deventer in June 2019.

Narrowest win margins (by runs)
The narrowest run margin victory is by 1 run which has been achieved in 32 ODI's with Australia winning such games a record 6 times. Netherlands has achieved victory by 1 run one time.

Narrowest win margins (by balls remaining)
The narrowest winning margin by balls remaining in ODIs is by winning of the last ball which has been achieved 36 times with both South Africa winning seven times. Netherlands has achieved victory by 2 balls when they defeated Canada during the Associates Triangular Series in South Africa in 2006–07 in Benoni, South Africa in December 2006.

Narrowest win margins (by wickets)
The narrowest margin of victory by wickets is 1 wicket which has settled 55 such ODIs. Both West Indies and New Zealand have recorded such victory on eight occasions. Netherlands has won the match by a margin of one wicket on one occasions.

Greatest loss margins (by runs)
Netherlands's biggest defeat by runs was against South Africa at the 2011 Cricket World Cup in Mohali, India.

Greatest loss margins (by balls remaining)
The greatest winning margin by balls remaining in ODIs was England's victory over Canada by 8 wickets with 277 balls remaining in the 1979 Cricket World Cup. The largest defeat suffered by Netherlands was against West Indies in the first match of the 2007 Quadrangular Series in Ireland when they lost by 10 wickets with 213 balls remaining.

Greatest loss margins (by wickets)
Netherlands have lost an ODI match by a margin of 10 wickets on one occasions with was against West Indies in the first match of the 2007 Quadrangular Series in Ireland when they lost by 10 wickets with 213 balls remaining.

Narrowest loss margins (by runs)
The narrowest loss of Netherlands in terms of runs is by 1 run suffered two times.

Narrowest loss margins (by balls remaining)
The narrowest winning margin by balls remaining in ODIs is by winning of the last ball which has been achieved 36 times with both South Africa winning seven times. Netherlands has suffered loss by 1 ball remaining two times.

Narrowest loss margins (by wickets)
Netherlands has suffered defeat by 1 wicket one times with most recent being against Scotland during the 2010 ICC World Cricket League Division One.

Tied matches 
A tie can occur when the scores of both teams are equal at the conclusion of play, provided that the side batting last has completed their innings. 
There have been 37 ties in ODIs history with Netherlands involved in one such games.

Individual records

Batting records

Most career runs
A run is the basic means of scoring in cricket.
India's Sachin Tendulkar with 18,246 runs in ODIs is the leading run scorer followed by Kumar Sangakkara of Sri Lanka with 14,234 runs and Ricky Ponting from Australia with 13,704. Ryan ten Doeschate is the only Dutch batsmen who have scored more than 1,500 runs in ODIs.

Fastest runs getter

Most runs in each batting position

Most runs against each team

Highest individual score
The fourth ODI of the Sri Lanka's tour of India in 2014 saw Rohit Sharma score the highest Individual score. The highest runs for Netherlands earned during at the 2014 Cricket World Cup Qualifier by Wesley Barresi, against Kenya.

Highest individual score – progression of record

Highest score against each opponent

Highest career average
A batsman's batting average is the total number of runs they have scored divided by the number of times they have been dismissed.

Highest Average in each batting position

Most half-centuries
A half-century is a score of between 50 and 99 runs. Statistically, once a batsman's score reaches 100, it is no longer considered a half-century but a century.

Sachin Tendulkar of India has scored the most half-centuries in ODIs with 96. He is followed by the Sri Lanka's Kumar Sangakkara on 93, South Africa's Jacques Kallis on 86 and India's Rahul Dravid and Pakistan's Inzamam-ul-Haq on 83.

Most centuries
A century is a score of 100 or more runs in a single innings.

Tendulkar has also scored the most centuries in ODIs with 49. India's Virat Kohli is next on 43 and Ricky Ponting with 30 hundreds is in third.

Most Sixes

Most Fours

Highest strike rates
Andre Russell of West Indies holds the record for highest strike rate, with minimum 500 balls faced qualification, with 130.22.Ryan ten Doeschate is the Dutch with the highest strike rate.

Highest strike rates in an inning
James Franklin of New Zealand's strike rate of 387.50 during his 31* off 8 balls against Canada during 2011 Cricket World Cup is the world record for highest strike rate in an innings.

Most runs in a calendar year
India's Sachin Tendulkar holds the record for most runs scored in a calendar year with 1894 runs scored in 1998.

Most runs in a series
The 1980-81 Benson & Hedges World Series Cup in Australia saw Greg Chappell set the record for the most runs scored in a single series scoring 685 runs. He is followed by Sachin Tendulkar with 673 runs scored in the 2003 Cricket World Cup.

Most ducks
A duck refers to a batsman being dismissed without scoring a run. 
Sanath Jayasuriya has scored the equal highest number of ducks in ODIs with 34 such knocks.

Bowling records

Most career wickets
A bowler takes the wicket of a batsman when the form of dismissal is bowled, caught, leg before wicket, stumped or hit wicket. If the batsman is dismissed by run out, obstructing the field, handling the ball, hitting the ball twice or timed out the bowler does not receive credit.

Sri Lanka's Muttiah Muralitharan has the most ODI wickets with 534.

Fastest wicket taker

Most career wickets against each team

Best figures in an innings
Bowling figures refers to the number of the wickets a bowler has taken and the number of runs conceded.
Sri Lanka's Chaminda Vaas holds the world record for best figures in an innings when he took 8/19 against Zimbabwe in December 2001 at Colombo (SSC). Timm van der Gugten holds the Dutch record for best bowling figures.

Best figures in an innings – progression of record

Best Bowling Figure against each opponent

Best career average
A bowler's bowling average is the total number of runs they have conceded divided by the number of wickets they have taken.
Afghanistan's Rashid Khan holds the record for the best career average in ODIs with 18.54. Joel Garner, West Indian cricketer, and a member of the highly regarded late 1970s and early 1980s West Indies cricket teams, is second behind Rashid with an overall career average of 18.84 runs per wicket. Mudassar Bukhari of Netherlands is the highest ranked Dutch when the qualification of 2000 balls bowled is followed.

Best career economy rate
A bowler's economy rate is the total number of runs they have conceded divided by the number of overs they have bowled.
West Indies' Joel Garner, holds the ODI record for the best career economy rate with 3.09. Netherlands's Pieter Seelaar, with a rate of 4.57 runs per over conceded over his 46-match ODI career, is the highest Dutch on the list.

Best career strike rate
A bowler's strike rate is the total number of balls they have bowled divided by the number of wickets they have taken.
The top bowler with the best ODI career strike rate is Australian Ryan Harris with strike rate of 23.4 balls per wicket. Dutch Mudassar Bukhari is at 139th position in this list.

Most four-wickets (& over) hauls in an innings
Pakistan's Waqar Younis, Sri Lanka's Muttiah Muralitharan and Australia's Brett Lee leading this list in ODIs.

Most five-wicket hauls in a match
A five-wicket haul refers to a bowler taking five wickets in a single innings.
Timm van der Gugten is the only ranked Dutch on the list of most five-wicket hauls which is headed by Pakistan's Waqar Younis with 13 such hauls.

Best economy rates in an inning
The best economy rate in an inning, when a minimum of 30 balls are delivered by the player, is West Indies player Phil Simmons economy of 0.30 during his spell of 3 runs for 4 wickets in 10 overs against Pakistan at Sydney Cricket Ground in the 1991-92 Australian Tri-Series. Billy Stelling holds the Dutch record during his spell in Quadrangular Series in Ireland in 2007 against Scotland at Stormont.

Best strike rates in an inning
The best strike rate in an inning, when a minimum of 4 wickets are taken by the player, is shared by Sunil Dhaniram of Canada, Paul Collingwood of England and Virender Sehwag of India when they achieved a strike rate of 4.2 balls per wicket.

Worst figures in an innings
The worst figures in an ODI came in the 5th One Day International between South Africa at home to Australia in 2006. Australia's Mick Lewis returned figures of 0/113 from his 10 overs in the second innings of the match. The worst figures by a Dutch is 0/81 that came off the bowling of Ahsan Malik in the only ODI of the South Africa's tour of Netherlands in 2013.

Most runs conceded in a match
Mick Lewis also holds the dubious distinction of most runs conceded in an ODI during the aforementioned match. The Dutch record in ODIs is held by Peter Borren on his debut match in the first ODI against Sri Lanka at the VRA Cricket Ground in July 2006. He returned figures of 1/94 from his 10 overs.

Most wickets in a calendar year
Pakistan's Saqlain Mushtaq holds the record for most wickets taken in a year when he took 69 wickets in 1997 in 36 ODIs. Netherlands's Ryan ten Doeschate has 23 wickets in 2007, that is the Dutch record.

Most wickets in a series
1998–99 Carlton and United Series involving Australia, England and Sri Lanka and the 2019 Cricket World Cup saw the records set for the most wickets taken by a bowler in an ODI series when Australian pacemen Glenn McGrath and Mitchell Starc achieved a total of 27 wickets during the series, respectively.

Wicket-keeping records
The wicket-keeper is a specialist fielder who stands behind the stumps being guarded by the batsman on strike and is the only member of the fielding side allowed to wear gloves and leg pads.

Most career dismissals
A wicket-keeper can be credited with the dismissal of a batsman in two ways, caught or stumped. A fair catch is taken when the ball is caught fully within the field of play without it bouncing after the ball has touched the striker's bat or glove holding the bat, Laws 5.6.2.2 and 5.6.2.3 state that the hand or the glove holding the bat shall be regarded as the ball striking or touching the bat while a stumping occurs when the wicket-keeper puts down the wicket while the batsman is out of his ground and not attempting a run.
Netherlands' Jeroen Smits is 56th in taking most dismissals in ODIs as a designated wicket-keeper Sri Lanka's Kumar Sangakkara and Australian Adam Gilchrist lead that category.

Most career catches
Smits is 53rd in taking most catches in ODIs as a designated wicket-keeper, this list leader is Gilchrist, Sangakkara and South Africa's Mark Boucher.

Most career stumpings
India's MS Dhoni holds the record for the most stumpings in ODIs with 123 followed by Sri Lankans Sangakkara and Romesh Kaluwitharana.

See also

List of One Day International cricket records
List of Netherlands Twenty20 International cricket records

Notes

References

One Day International cricket records
Cricket in the Netherlands